Cickini is the name of an early Christian church constructed in the 6th century AD.  It is located in the village of Sveti Vid-Miholjice within the municipality of Malinska-Dubašnica on the island of Krk, Croatia.  It is situated in a forest near an area called Sršić, a few hundred meters from the D102 road.

History 

Construction is believed to have started on the site in the 6th century AD at a location of a Roman village that dates to the 1st century.  The bishop of Krk used the location as a temporary refuge.  It is believed to have been abandoned after the 9th century.  In addition to the church there is a 2,500 sq meter residential complex that has yet to be excavated.

The Site Today 

The remains of church was discovered in 2002.  A small museum dedicated to the site is located in Sveti Vid.  The museum contains artifacts that have been excavated from the site, including tablets

Citations

References 

 
 Archaeology of Croatia
 Archaeological sites in Croatia
 Roman sites in Croatia
 Medieval sites in Croatia
Primorje-Gorski Kotar County